Nettanige  is a village in Kasaragod district in the state of Kerala, India.

Demographics
As of 2011 Census, Nettanige village had a population of 6,305 with 3,183 males and 3,122 females. In Nettanige, 9.7% of the population was under 6 years of age. Nettanige had an average literacy of 84.63% higher than the national average of 74% and lower than the state average of 94%: male literacy was 90.30% and female literacy was 78.87%.

References

Suburbs of Kasaragod